A Cassette Tape Culture (Phase One) is the second recording by American industrial band ATelecine, released in 2010 through Pendu Sound Recordings in a limited edition of 500 copies.

Track listing
Side Y
 "Find Nothing Else"
 "Chroeg Xen"
 "It's All Write"
 "She Is Beautiful"
 "Kitchen Light"
 "A Cassette Played"
Side Z
 "Auon" (live ver)
 "Some What Daft"
 "Elijah's New Sun"
 "I Came I Sat I Departed"
 "RH"
 "Never Was a Dreamer"

References

2010 albums
ATelecine albums